XHMIL-FM is a radio station on 90.1 FM in Los Mochis, Sinaloa, Mexico. It is owned by Radiorama, jointly operated with Promomedios, and is known as La Ke Buena with a grupera format.

History
XEMIL-AM 1000 received its concession on July 18, 1984. It moved to FM in 2010.

Until 2014, it was known as Romántica with a romantic format. In 2014, Radiorama and Promomedios Sinaloa began joint operations of Radiorama's Los Mochis cluster.

On September 10, 2021, La Nueva was replaced by La Ke Buena, which had been dropped by XHMAX-FM 102.5.

References

Radio stations in Sinaloa